Malleostemon decipiens is a plant species of the family Myrtaceae endemic to Western Australia.

It is found in the Wheatbelt region of Western Australia between Mingenew, Morawa and Three Springs where it grows in sandy soils.

References

decipiens
Flora of Western Australia
Plants described in 2012
Taxa named by William Vincent Fitzgerald